Fraser Murray (born 7 May 1999) is a Scottish footballer, who plays for Scottish Premiership side Kilmarnock.

Club career

Hibernian
Murray was given his first team debut for Hibernian in a 2016–17 Scottish Challenge Cup tie against Highland League club Turriff United, in September 2016. He scored the first goal in a 3–0 win for Hibs. Later in the season, he made his league debut in a 3–2 win against Raith Rovers.

During October 2018, Murray signed a contract with Hibernian that was due to run until the summer of 2023.

In September 2020, Murray joined Scottish Championship side Dunfermline Athletic on a season-long loan. Murray scored his first goals for Dunfermline in a 3–0 win at Kilmarnock on 13 October.

Kilmarnock
On 17 June 2021, Murray signed for Kilmarnock on a two-year deal. On 10 July 2021, Murray scored on his Kilmarnock debut in a 2–0 away win against East Kilbride in the Scottish League Cup.

International career
Murray was selected for the Scotland under-19 squad in November 2017. He made five appearances for the under-19 team in total.

Career statistics

References

1999 births
Living people
Association football midfielders
Scottish footballers
Scottish Professional Football League players
Hibernian F.C. players
Scotland youth international footballers
Footballers from Glasgow
Dunfermline Athletic F.C. players
Kilmarnock F.C. players